The Ascetosporea are a group of eukaryotes that are parasites of animals, especially marine invertebrates.  The two groups, the haplosporids and paramyxids, are not particularly similar morphologically, but consistently group together on molecular trees, which place them near the base of the Cercozoa. Both produce spores without the complex structures found in similar groups (such as polar filaments or tubules).

Haplosporid spores have a single nucleus and an opening at one end, covered with an internal diaphragm or a distinctive hinged lid. After emerging, it develops within the cells of its host, usually a marine mollusc or annelid, although some infect other groups or freshwater species.  The trophic cell is generally multinucleated. Paramyxids develop within the digestive system of marine invertebrates, and undergo internal budding to produce multicellular spores.

A 2009 study concluded that Haplosporidium species form a paraphyletic group and that the taxonomy of the haplosporidians needs a thorough revision.

Taxonomy
Class Ascetosporea Desportes & Ginsburger-Vogel, 1977 emend. Cavalier-Smith 2009
 Genus ?Marteilioides Comps, Park & Desportes 1986
 Genus ?Oryctospora Purrini & Weiser 1991
 Order Claustrosporida Cavalier-Smith 2003
 Family Claustrosporidiidae Larsson 1987
 Genus Claustrosporidium Larsson 1987
 Order Paradiniida Cavalier-Smith 2009
 Family Paradiniidae Schiller 1935
 Genus Paradinium Chatton, 1910
 Order Mikrocytida Hartikainen et al. 2014
 Family Mikrocytidae Hartikainen et al. 2014 
 Genus Paramikrocytos Hartikainen et al. 2014
 Genus Microcytos Farley, Wolf & Elston 1988
 Order Paramyxida Chatton 1911 [Paramyxea Chatton 1911; Paramyxidea Chatton 1911; Paramyxa]
 Family Marteiliidae Grizel et al. 1974 [Occlusosporida; Marteiliida Desportes & Ginsburger-Vogel, 1977; Marteiliidea Desportes & Ginsburger-Vogel, 1977]
 Genus Paramarteilia Ginsburger-Vogel & Desportes 1979
 Genus Marteilia Grizel et al. 1974
 Family Paramyxidae Chatton 1911
 Genus Paramyxa Chatton 1911
 Order Haplosporida Caullery & Mesnil 1899 [Balanosporida Sprague, 1979; Haplosporidia Hall, 1953; Haplosporea Caullery 1953; Haplospora Margulis & Schwartz, 1998; Haplosporidiidea Poche, 1913; Haplosporidies Caullery and Mesnil, 1905]
 Genus ?Bertramia Mesnil & Caullery 1897 non Weiser & McCauley 1974
 Genus ?Coleospora Gibbs 1959
 Family Nephridiophagidae Sprague 1970 [Nephridiophagea]
 Genus Nephridiophaga Woolever 1966 [Coelosporidium Mesnil & Marchoux 1897]
 Family Urosporidiidae Sprague 1979 [Anurosporidiidae]
 Genus Urosporidium Caullery & Mesnil 1905 [Anurosporidium Caullery & Chappelier 1906] (8 species)
 Family Haplosporidiidae Sprague 1979
 Genus Bonamia Pichot et al. 1980
 Genus Haplosporidium Caullery & Mesnil 1899 (23 species)
 Genus Minchinia (Lankester 1895) Labbe 1896 (5 species)

See also
Haplosporidium nelsoni

References 

Endomyxa
Parasitic rhizaria
Cercozoa classes